Mohamed Sanhaji Brahmi (born 15 April 1999), commonly known as Moha, is a Moroccan footballer who plays for Betis Deportivo Balompié as a left winger. He also holds Spanish nationality.

Club career
Born in Guercif, Moha moved to Soria, Castile and León, aged only one, and was a CD Numancia youth graduate. He made his senior debut with the reserves on 9 April 2016, aged only 16, by coming on as a substitute for Edipo Rodríguez in a 0–1 Tercera División home loss against Ciudad Rodrigo CF.

Moha scored his first senior goal on 3 September 2016, netting the opener in a 3–1 away win against CD Cebrereña. He continued to appear regularly for the B-side in the following years, and signed a new contract with the club on 10 August 2019, being definitely promoted to the main squad by new manager Luis Carrión.

Moha made his first team debut on 18 August 2019, replacing fellow youth graduate Nacho in a 0–1 home loss against AD Alcorcón in the Segunda División. He scored his first professional goal on 16 November, netting the equalizer in a 2–2 home draw against Rayo Vallecano.

On 16 December 2019, Moha renewed his contract with Numancia until 2024.

Career statistics

Club

References

External links
 
 
 

1999 births
Living people
People from Guercif
Moroccan footballers
Morocco youth international footballers
Association football wingers
Segunda División players
Primera Federación players
Segunda División B players
Tercera División players
CD Numancia B players
CD Numancia players
Betis Deportivo Balompié footballers
Moroccan expatriate footballers
Expatriate footballers in Spain